The first season of CSI: Miami premiered on CBS on September 23, 2002, and ended on May 19, 2003. The show's regular time slot was Mondays at 10:00 pm. The series stars David Caruso, Emily Procter, and Kim Delaney.

Cast and characters

Main characters 
 Lieutenant Horatio "H" Caine (David Caruso); an explosives and armaments specialist who was fundamental in establishing CSI in 1997. He recently became Director of the MDPD Crime Lab, after several years as a Supervisor.
 Lieutenant Megan Donner (Kim Delaney); the previous Director of the MDPD Crime Lab returning from six months' extended leave. She is Horatio's partner, though the two have a professional rivalry. (Episodes 1 - 10)
 Detective Calleigh Duquesne (Emily Procter); a ballistics specialist and a founding member of Crime Scene Investigations. She's worked in the lab since 1997, also specializing in DNA recovery.
 Detective Eric Delko (Adam Rodriguez); the newest member of the CSI team, joining in early 2002. He's a finger-print and drugs specialist who has recently completed his probationary patrol period.
 Detective Timothy 'Tim' "Speed" Speedle (Rory Cochrane); a Senior Detective hired at the recommendation of Jesse Cardoza in the late '90s. He is a specialist in trace and impressions.
 Assistant Chief Medical Examiner Dr. Alexx Woods (Khandi Alexander); a Miami Dade County Coroner who works alongside the Day Shift CSIs. She is extremely compassionate and oftentimes speaks to dead bodies.

Special guest appearances 
 Sofia Milos as Detective Yelina Salas; Horatio's sister-in-law and a senior Robbery-Homicide Division (RHD) Detective assigned to assist the CSI's.
 Rex Linn as Detective Frank Tripp; a senior Robbery-Homicide Division (RHD) Detective assigned to assist the CSI's.

Guest starring 
 Wanda de Jesus as Adelle Sevilla; an MDPD Robbery-Homicide Division (RHD) Detective assigned to assist the CSI's.
 Holt McCallany as John Hagen; a senior MDPD Robbery-Homicide Division (RHD) Detective assigned to assist the CSI's.
 Michael Whaley as Bernstein; an MDPD Robbery-Homicide Division (RHD) Detective assigned to assist the CSI's.

Episodes

References

01
2002 American television seasons
2003 American television seasons